is a Japanese rock band formed in 1997 in Kyoto, signed to Universal Music Japan and managed by Badass. Their music styles are mix of rock, punk, heavy metal, reggae, hip-hop, guitar pop and bossa nova.

Band members
 Takuma Mitamura (三田村 卓真) – lead vocals and lead and rhythm electric guitar
 Naoki Inoue (井上 直樹) – electric bass guitar and backing vocals
 Kouichi Nakaoka (中岡 浩一) – drum kit and backing vocals

Discography

Studio albums

Best albums

Singles

Covers and tributes

Collaborations

References

External links

 
 10-Feet at Universal Music

Japanese rock music groups
Japanese alternative rock groups
Universal Music Japan artists
Japanese indie rock groups
Melodic hardcore groups
Musical groups from Kyoto Prefecture
Musical groups established in 1997
1997 establishments in Japan